Swarraton is a small village in the City of Winchester district of Hampshire, England. At the 2011 Census the village population was included in the civil parish of Northington. Its nearest railway station is in New Alresford, on the Mid-Hants section of the London and South Western Railway.

References

Villages in Hampshire